Laura Rivera (born 17 October 1954) is a Mexican gymnast. She competed at the 1968 Summer Olympics and the 1972 Summer Olympics.

References

1954 births
Living people
Mexican female artistic gymnasts
Olympic gymnasts of Mexico
Gymnasts at the 1968 Summer Olympics
Gymnasts at the 1972 Summer Olympics
Sportspeople from Mexico City
20th-century Mexican women